The Church of England Record Society is a text publication society for the history of the Church of England. It was established in 1991. The society has published an annual volume since 1994, the first being Kenneth Fincham's Visitation Articles and Injunctions of the Early Stuart Church (Vol. 1). The society is a registered charity.

Selected publications

1990s
 Kenneth Fincham, Visitation Articles and Injunctions of the Early Stuart Church, volume 1, 1994. 
 Jeremy Gregory, The Speculum of Archbishop Thomas Secker: the Diocese of Canterbury, 1758–1768, 1995. 
 Sarah Brewer, The Early Letters of Bishop Richard Hurd, 1739–1762, 1995. 
 Andrew Chandler, Brethren in Adversity: Bishop George Bell, the Church of England and the Crisis of German Protestantism, 1933–1939, 1997. 
 Kenneth Fincham, Visitation Articles and Injunctions of the Early Stuart Church, volume 2, 1998. 
 Gerald Bray, The Anglican Canons, 1529–1947, 1998. 
 Stephen Taylor, From Cranmer to Davidson. A Church of England Miscellany, 1999.

2000s
 Gerald Bray, Tudor Church Reform: the Henrician Canons of 1535 and the Reformatio Legum Ecclesiasticarum, 2000. 
 Susan Mumm, All Saints Sisters of the Poor. An Anglican Sisterhood in the Nineteenth Century, 2001. 
 Patrick Collinson, John Craig and Brett Usher, Conferences and Combination Lectures in the Elizabethan Church. Dedham and Bury St. Edmunds, 1582–1590, 2003. 
 Tom Webster and Kenneth Shipps, The Diary of Samuel Rogers, 1634–1638, 2004. 
 Mark Smith and Stephen Taylor, Evangelicalism in the Church of England c.1790–c.1890, 2004. 
 Anthony Milton, The British Delegation and the Synod of Dort, 1618–19, 2005. 
 Henrietta Blackmore, The Beginning of Women's Ministry: The Revival of the Deaconess in the Nineteenth-Century Church of England, 2007. 
 G. M. Ditchfield, The Letters of Theophilus Lindsey (1728–1808), volume 1, 2007. 
 Michael Snape, The Back Parts of War: The Y.M.C.A. Memoirs and Letters of Barclay Baron, 1915–1919. 2009.

2010s
 Susan Hardman Moore, The Diary of Thomas Larkham, 1647–1669. 2011. 
 Melanie Barber and Stephen Taylor, with Gabriel Sewell, From the Reformation to the Permissive Society. A Miscellany in Celebration of the 400th Anniversary of Lambeth Palace Library. 2010. 
 G. M. Ditchfield The Letters of Theophilus Lindsey (1723–1808). Volume II: 1789–1808. 2012. 
 Natalie Mears, Alasdair Raffe, Stephen Taylor and Philip Williamson (with Lucy Bates), National Prayers. Special Worship since the Reformation. Volume 1: Special Prayers, Fasts and Thanksgivings in the British Isles 1533–1688. 2013. 
 Andrew Atherstone, The Journal of Bishop Daniel Wilson of Calcutta, 1845-1857. 2014. 
 Philip Williamson, Alasdair Raffe, Stephen Taylor and Natalie Mears, National Prayers. Special Worship since the Reformation. Volume II: General Fasts, Thanksgivings and Special Prayers in the British Isles, 1689–1870. 2017. 
 Kenneth Fincham, The Further Correspondence of William Laud. 2017.

References

External links 
Official website

1991 establishments in England
History of the Church of England
Text publication societies